#0 por Movistar Plus+ (read as Cero, Spanish for Zero) is a Spanish commercial television channel, launched on 1 February 2016 to replace Canal+. The channel is operated by Telefónica and is available on the digital satellite television and IPTV platform Movistar Plus+.

Programmes

References

External links
 

Television stations in Spain
Television stations in the Community of Madrid
Mass media in Madrid
Companies based in the Community of Madrid
Television channels and stations established in 2016
2016 establishments in Spain